Kishore Pradhan (1936–2019) was an Indian Marathi film and theatre actor. He was known for Hindi films like Jab We Met, Lage Raho Munnabhai, McMafia and Jack Irish.

Biography 
Pradhan was born into a Hindu family in Nagpur in 1936. He started acting while at school. He graduated from Morris College in Nagpur where he used to act in college festivals and later started the theatre group Natraj. Subh Lagna Savdhaan was his last Marathi film.

On 11 January 2019,  Pradhan died at the age of 86.

Filmography

Television

References 

1936 births
Male actors in Hindi cinema
2019 deaths